General elections were held in the Marshall Islands on 10 April 1979.

Results
Four of the 33 seats in the Legislature were won by candidates representing the Voice of the Marshalls group, with the other 29 taken by independents.

Aftermath
Following the elections, the Legislature elected Amata Kabua as president. In preparation for self-government, a ten-member cabinet was formed on 1 May 1979.

References

Marshall
1979 in the Trust Territory of the Pacific Islands
Elections in the Marshall Islands